Sweetwater is an unincorporated community in Newton County, in the U.S. state of Missouri. The community is located at the intersection of Missouri routes H and HH approximately five miles southeast of Neosho. Aroma is 2.5 miles north  and Boulder City lies two miles southeast on Route H.

History
A post office called Sweetwater was established in 1894, and remained in operation until 1907. The community was named after nearby Sweetwater Branch creek.

References

Unincorporated communities in Newton County, Missouri
Unincorporated communities in Missouri